The New Prophecy can refer to several things.

Montanism, an early Christian movement
Warriors: The New Prophecy, a juvenile fantasy novel series about feral cats by Erin Hunter